Soy sauce chicken is a traditional Cantonese cuisine dish made of chicken cooked with soy sauce. It is considered as a siu mei dish in Hong Kong.

Another Cantonese dish, white cut chicken, often served with a salty ginger-onion paste, is more savoured for the taste of the meat, where the freshness of the chicken is noticeable.

Singapore's Hong Kong Soya Sauce Chicken Rice and Noodle, formerly the cheapest Michelin-starred restaurant in the world (having lost its star in 2021), specializes in this dish and offers it for the equivalent of US$2.

See also
 Ayam kecap
 Crispy fried chicken
 Swiss wing
 Teriyaki
 List of chicken dishes

References

External links
 Soy sauce chicken page (Chinese)
 Soy sauce chicken recipe

Cantonese cuisine
Chinese chicken dishes
Hong Kong cuisine
Soy-based foods